Leukocyte antigen CD37 is a protein that in humans is encoded by the CD37 gene.

Function 

The protein encoded by this gene is a member of the transmembrane 4 superfamily, also known as the tetraspanin family. Most of these members are cell-surface proteins that are characterized by the presence of four hydrophobic transmembrane domains. Tetraspanins mediate signal transduction events that play a role in the regulation of immune responses, cell development, activation, growth and motility. CD37 expression is restricted to cells of the immune system, with highest abundance on mature B cells, and lower expression is found on T cells and myeloid cells. CD37 is a cell surface glycoprotein that is known to complex with integrins and other transmembrane 4 superfamily proteins. Alternate splicing results in multiple transcript variants encoding different isoforms. CD37 controls both humoral and cellular immune responses. CD37-deficiency in mice leads to spontaneous development on B cell lymphoma, and patients with CD37-negative lymphomas have a worse clinical outcome.

See also 
 Cluster of differentiation

References

Further reading

External links 
 
 

Clusters of differentiation